A Woman's Awakening is a 1917 American silent drama film directed by Chester Withey and starring Seena Owen, Kate Bruce and Spottiswoode Aitken.

Cast
 Seena Owen as 	Paula Letchworth
 Kate Bruce as 	Mrs. Letchworth
 Allan Sears as Allen Cotter 
 Spottiswoode Aitken as Judge Cotter
 Charles K. Gerrard as Lawrence Topham 
 Alma Rubens as Cousin Kate 
 Jennie Lee as Mammie

References

Bibliography
 Langman, Larry. American Film Cycles: The Silent Era. Greenwood Publishing, 1998.

External links
 

1917 films
1917 drama films
1910s English-language films
American silent feature films
Silent American drama films
American black-and-white films
Films directed by Chester Withey
Triangle Film Corporation films
1910s American films